The pretracheal lymph nodes are lymph nodes located anterior to the trachea in the neck.

Structure 
The pretracheal lymph nodes lie anterior to the trachea. They follow the anterior jugular veins either side of the midline. They drain into the deep cervical lymph nodes on the right and the thoracic duct on the left.

References

External links
 http://www.emedicine.com/ent/topic306.htm#section~anatomy_of_the_cervical_lymphatics

Lymphatics of the head and neck